This article is a list of diseases of wheat (Triticum spp.) grouped by causative agent.

Bacterial diseases

Fungal diseases

Viral diseases

Phytoplasmal diseases

Nematodes, parasitic

References

Common Names of Diseases, The American Phytopathological Society

Further reading
 
 , earlier but more detail
 

Wheat